Alexander Benedict McMurtrie Jr. (born October 5, 1935) is an American lawyer and politician who served in the Virginia House of Delegates from 1972 to 1982. After losing his 1981 reelection bid, McMurtrie has run five campaigns for state senate, seeking the 10th district seat in 1991 and 2015 and the 11th district seat in 1994, 1999, and 2007.

References

External links

1935 births
Living people
Democratic Party members of the Virginia House of Delegates
Virginia lawyers
University of Notre Dame alumni
Georgetown University Law Center alumni